Jeremy Case is an American college basketball coach who is an assistant coach at the University of Kansas. He won an National Championship as a player at Kansas in 2008 and won another championship as an assistant coach in 2022.

High school career
Case played for the McAlester High School in McAlester, Oklahoma. When he graduated, Case was the school's all-time leading scorer in basketball with 2,249 points, winning a regional championship and making the state 5A tournament twice, and playing at the varsity level all four years. The McAlester News-Capital also named Case as the 2002 all-area basketball player of the year. Case was named to the school's McAlester Athletics Hall of Fame in 2017.

Case received offers from many universities including Oklahoma, Ohio State, Notre Dame, Oklahoma State, and Colorado. On July 9, 2003, he announced his choice to play college basketball at the University of Kansas.

College career
Case played in 94 games while at Kansas. During his time he won four Big 12 championships, 3 Elite Eights, and the 2008 National Championship. He was a two-time Academic All-Big 12 First Team honoree in 2006 and 2008.

Coaching career
Case remained at Kansas as a graduate assistant from 2008 to 2009. Case left Kansas to work as an assistant coach at Southeast Missouri State from 2009 to 2012. From 2012 to 2016, he was an assistant coach at Houston Baptist University. Case returned to Kansas to serve as video coordinator in August 2016. He was promoted to assistant coach at Kansas on an interim basis in the summer of 2021 before being named full time assistant a few months later.

Personal
Case lives with his wife and son in Lawrence, Kansas. His father, Win Case, was the head basketball coach at Oklahoma City University from 1993 until 2005 and is an assistant coach at Ole Miss. Win was a college teammate of Bill Self at Oklahoma State during the 1980s.

References

21st-century African-American people
20th-century African-American sportspeople
Living people
African-American basketball players
Kansas Jayhawks men's basketball coaches
Kansas Jayhawks men's basketball players
Shooting guards
21st-century African-American sportspeople
20th-century African-American people
Basketball coaches from Oklahoma
Basketball players from Oklahoma
Year of birth missing (living people)